Everett Township is the name of the following places within the United States:

 Everett Township, Michigan, in Newaygo County
 Everett Township, Burt County, Nebraska
 Everett Township, Dodge County, Nebraska

See also 
 Everett (disambiguation)

Township name disambiguation pages